Damir Džidić (born 15 February 1987) is a Bosnian and Croatian retired professional footballer who played as a centre-back. He is the younger brother of Ivica Džidić.

Honours

Player
Zrinjski Mostar
Bosnian Premier League: 2008–09

Široki Brijeg
Bosnian Cup: 2012–13

References

External links
Damir Džidić at Sofascore

1987 births
Living people
Sportspeople from Mostar
Croats of Bosnia and Herzegovina
Bosnia and Herzegovina emigrants to Croatia
Association football central defenders
Croatian footballers
Croatia youth international footballers
Croatia under-21 international footballers
HŠK Zrinjski Mostar players
NK Zagreb players
NK Široki Brijeg players
Premier League of Bosnia and Herzegovina players
Croatian Football League players